Elections in the Republic of India in 1968 included elections to the Haryana Legislative Assembly and to seats in the Rajya Sabha.

Legislative Assembly elections

Haryana

Elections were held in 1968 in Haryana State for the Haryana Legislative Assembly

Rajya Sabha

References

External links

 Election Commission of India

1968 elections in India
India
1968 in India
Elections in India by year